Jānis Sprukts (born January 31, 1982) is a Latvian professional ice hockey forward.

Biography
As a youth, Sprukts played in the 1996 Quebec International Pee-Wee Hockey Tournament with a team from Riga. He was drafted by Panthers as their eighth-round pick, #234 overall, in the 2000 NHL Entry Draft.

Sprukts has played two seasons of hockey in North America, then three seasons in Europe with Odense Bulldogs, ASK/Ogre, HK Rīga 2000, HPK. In 2006, he returned to North America, where he signed with the Florida Panthers.  He started the 2006/2007 season in Panthers farmclub American Hockey League team Rochester Americans. In October 2006, after 4 games in AHL, he was called up to the Florida Panthers. On 20 October he played his first NHL game against the Philadelphia Flyers, but on 21 December, playing against the New York Rangers, recorded his first point in the NHL. On April 6, 2007, Jānis scored his first career NHL goal against Marc Denis and the Tampa Bay Lightning in a Panthers 7-2 victory. In 2009, he left North America and then played in the KHL for Dinamo Riga and CSKA Moscow.

Career statistics

Regular season and playoffs

International

References

External links

 
 
 
 

1982 births
Living people
Acadie–Bathurst Titan players
ASK/Ogre players
Dinamo Riga players
Florida Panthers draft picks
Florida Panthers players
HC Fribourg-Gottéron players
HC CSKA Moscow players
HK Riga 2000 players
HPK players
Ice hockey players at the 2010 Winter Olympics
Ice hockey players at the 2014 Winter Olympics
Latvian ice hockey forwards
Lukko players
MHC Martin players
Odense Bulldogs players
Olympic ice hockey players of Latvia
HC Red Ice players
Ritten Sport players
Rochester Americans players
Ice hockey people from Riga
Vaasan Sport players
Latvian expatriate sportspeople in Canada
Latvian expatriate sportspeople in Finland
Latvian expatriate sportspeople in Denmark
Latvian expatriate sportspeople in the United States
Latvian expatriate sportspeople in Russia
Latvian expatriate sportspeople in Switzerland
Latvian expatriate sportspeople in Slovakia
Latvian expatriate sportspeople in Italy
Expatriate ice hockey players in Canada
Expatriate ice hockey players in Finland
Expatriate ice hockey players in Denmark
Expatriate ice hockey players in the United States
Expatriate ice hockey players in Russia
Expatriate ice hockey players in Switzerland
Expatriate ice hockey players in Slovakia
Expatriate ice hockey players in Italy
Latvian expatriate ice hockey people